Gabriel Pozzo (born March 26, 1979) is an Argentine rally driver competing in the World Rally Championship. His co-driver is Daniel Stillo. He is the PWRC champion of 2001 season. Pozzo was driving for Škoda Motorsport in 2002–2003.

WRC results

PWRC results

IRC results

References 

 Profile at ewrc-results.com

Argentine racing drivers
World Rally Championship drivers
Intercontinental Rally Challenge drivers
Argentine rally drivers
Living people
1979 births
Škoda Motorsport drivers